Garden Plain Township may refer to one of the following townships in the United States:

Garden Plain Township, Whiteside County, Illinois
Garden Plain Township, Sedgwick County, Kansas

See also
Garden Plain (disambiguation)

Township name disambiguation pages